Saint Gwladys ferch Brychan or St Gladys (Latin-Claudia), was the beautiful Queen of Saint Gwynllyw Milwr.

Gwladys is also the name of:
 Gwladys ferch Dafydd (died 1300s), Welsh noblewoman, daughter of Dafydd ap Gruffudd
 Gwladys ferch Dafydd Gam (died 1454), Welsh noblewoman, wife of Roger Vaughan and William ap Thomas
 Gwladys Beckett (1897–1943) who became Lady Charles Markham and then Gwladys, Lady Delamere
 Gwladys Épangue (born 1983), French taekwondo athlete
 Gwladys Evan Morris (fl. 1929), British actress and writer
 Gwladys Nocera (born 1975), French golfer
 Gwladys Robinson, Marchioness of Ripon

See also
 Gwladus Ddu (died 1254), Welsh noblewoman, daughter of Llywelyn the Great of Gwynedd
 Gladys (disambiguation)
 Gladys (given name)

Welsh feminine given names